This is the results breakdown of the local elections held in the Balearic Islands on 22 May 2011. The following tables show detailed results in the autonomous community's most populous municipalities, sorted alphabetically.

Opinion polls

Alaior polling

Ciutadella de Menorca polling

Es Castell polling

Es Mercadal polling

Es Migjorn Gran polling

Ferreries polling

Inca polling

Maó-Mahón polling

Marratxí polling

Palma polling

Sant Lluís polling

Overall

City control
The following table lists party control in the most populous municipalities, including provincial capitals (shown in bold). Gains for a party are displayed with the cell's background shaded in that party's colour.

Municipalities

Calvià
Population: 51,462

Ciutadella de Menorca
Population: 29,247

Ibiza
Population: 49,516

Inca
Population: 29,321

Llucmajor
Population: 36,681

Manacor
Population: 40,859

Maó-Mahón
Population: 29,050

Palma
Population: 404,681

Santa Eulària des Riu
Population: 32,637

Island Councils

See also
2011 Balearic regional election

Notes

References
Opinion poll sources

Other

Balearic Islands
2011